SS David C. Reid was an American molasses tanker that sank on 14 October 1928.

Memorial
The David C. Reid's radio operator, J. Maurice Black, is honored on the Wireless Operator's Monument in Battery Park, New York City.  Strangely, the entry lists the location as "South Atlantic".

Storm
The American Meteorological Society's Monthly Weather Review for October 1928 noted that David C. Reid was not far from a tropical storm at the time she disappeared.

References

Tankers of the United States
Maritime incidents in 1928
Shipwrecks in the Atlantic Ocean
Missing ships